The 2014–15 Federal Hockey League season was the fifth season of the Federal Hockey League.  The Watertown Wolves won the season championship in their first year under new ownership.

Regular season
The FHL awarded a new franchise to play in Southwest Pennsylvania to begin play in the 2014–15 season, named the Southwest Pennsylvania Magic (shortened to SWPA Magic). The Magic were to play at the Rostraver Ice Garden in Belle Vernon, Pennsylvania bringing the league to five teams and a return to Pennsylvania after the folding of the Williamsport Outlaws in the 2012–13 season. In an interview, commissioner Don Kirnan stated he hoped to see as many as seven to eight teams in the FHL by the next season. However, after playing one game in which they lost 10-2 to the Berkshire Battalion, the Magic's membership in the league was revoked due to financial problems. They were replaced, under new ownership, by the Steel City Warriors, continuing to play out of Belle Vernon.

On July 14, 2014, the FHL announced another new franchise to begin play in Berlin, New Hampshire, to be called the Berlin River Drivers. However on September 8, 2014, the league announced that the league would expand instead into North Adams, Massachusetts, with the Berkshire Battalion, citing the market to be a better fit.

During the previous season, a group of local investors worked to purchase the Watertown Privateers, owned by Don Kirnan. On May 14, 2014, news circulated that the owners group, named Top Shelf Hockey, LLC and led by local businessman Stanley Tibbles, had acquired Kirnan's franchise rights and started a new team named the Watertown Wolves.

On October 30, 2014, it was announced that a neutral site game would take place on January 31, 2015, in Port Huron, Michigan at McMorran Place, with an eye towards future expansion into Port Huron. The Danville Dashers  defeated the Danbury Whalers 4 to 1 in the Port Huron game. The attendance at the game was 1,709. The Port Huron Prowlers were announced to begin the following season.

The Watertown Wolves captured first place by the end of regular season and were followed by the Dayton Demonz in second place. The Wolves won the FHL Championship in the playoffs over the Danville Dashers in a five-game series.

Standings

 Advanced to playoffs
* midseason replacement
 folded midseason

Playoffs

References

External links 
 Federal Hockey League website

FHL
Federal Prospects Hockey League seasons